Friendship Heights is a Washington Metro station straddling the border of Washington, D.C. and Montgomery County, Maryland, United States. The station was opened on August 25, 1984, and is operated by the Washington Metropolitan Area Transit Authority (WMATA).

Location
Providing service for the Red Line, the station is at the 5400 block of Wisconsin Avenue, Northwest and serves the neighborhoods of Chevy Chase and Friendship Heights. The area is a major retail shopping and broadcast media district. The station also serves as a bus depot linking Montgomery County Transit's Ride-On bus system with the Washington Metro. It is directly adjacent to the Western Division Metrobus garage on 44th Street and Harrison Street NW.

Notable places nearby 
 GEICO Headquarters
 Lisner-Louise-Dickson-Hurt Home
 Mazza Gallerie, The Shops at Wisconsin Place, Chevy Chase Pavilion, and other shopping centers
 WSBN, WMAL-FM, WLVW, WTOP-FM, and WFED radio stations

History
The station opened on August 25, 1984.

To enable Metro to perform train turnarounds south of Grosvenor-Strathmore, a diamond crossover exists just north of the station. Occasionally, during rush hours (for schedule adjustments) or during track maintenance, trains terminate here. When this happens, trains offload their passengers on the Shady Grove-bound track, exit the station, switch direction just north of the interlocking, and then run through the interlocking to the Glenmont (towards downtown)-bound track.

Station layout
This station uses the four-coffer arch design found at most underground stations on the western side of the Red Line. Unlike its many counterparts such as Van Ness-UDC and Tenleytown-AU, the station's walls are more rounded. Friendship Heights is the only station in the system with this design that has mezzanines at both ends of the platform.

The station is one of 11 stations in the system constructed with rock tunneling and is accordingly deeper than most stations in the system. The escalator ride from the common room at the north entrance to the mezzanine level takes roughly a minute and a half.

Two of its five exits sit on the Maryland side of Western Avenue, whereas the other three exit into the District. At the Western Avenue entrance, four separate street entrances come together in an upper mezzanine, allowing riders to access a set of three escalators that go to the platform. One entrance is located at a side entrance to the lobby of an entrance to the C-level of Mazza Gallerie that has access to Western Avenue. Another entrance offers direct access to Chevy Chase Pavilion. The newest entrance, located off Wisconsin Avenue next to The Shops at Wisconsin Place, opened between 2011 and 2022, replacing an earlier entrance that led directly into a Hecht's. The new entrance is located across Wisconsin Avenue from the station's main entrance, which surfaces in a large bus depot underneath the Chevy Chase Metro Building. A second entrance, at the intersection of Wisconsin Avenue and Jenifer Street NW, is elevator-only, with four high-speed elevators servicing the station's south mezzanine.

References

External links
 

 The Schumin Web Transit Center: Friendship Heights Station
 Western Avenue entrance from Google Maps Street View
 Jennifer Street entrance from Google Maps Street View

1984 establishments in Maryland
1984 establishments in Washington, D.C.
Friendship Heights
Friendship Village, Maryland
Stations on the Red Line (Washington Metro)
Railway stations in Montgomery County, Maryland
Railway stations in the United States opened in 1984
Railway stations located underground in Maryland
Railway stations located underground in Washington, D.C.
Washington Metro stations in Maryland
Washington Metro stations in Washington, D.C.